Songjiang Sports Center is a station on Line 9 of the Shanghai Metro. The station is designed to serve the future Songjiang Sports Center. It began operation on 30 December 2012.

Railway stations in Shanghai
Shanghai Metro stations in Songjiang District
Railway stations in China opened in 2012
Line 9, Shanghai Metro